Platelet-activating factor acetylhydrolase IB subunit beta is an enzyme that in humans is encoded by the PAFAH1B2 gene.

Interactions 

PAFAH1B2 has been shown to interact with PAFAH1B1.

See also 
 PAFAH1B1
 PAFAH1B3

References

Further reading